El escritor José de Espronceda is an oil painting of 1842 by Antonio María Esquivel now in the Museo del Prado. It is a portrait of poet José de Espronceda.

There is a replica at the Biblioteca Nacional de Madrid and Ateneo de Madrid thanks to Manuel Arroyo.

References 

Romantic paintings
1842 paintings
Paintings of the Museo del Prado by Spanish artists